Styloniscidae is a family of woodlice, including the following genera:
Clavigeroniscus Arcangeli, 1930
Cordioniscus Graeve, 1914
Indoniscus Vandel, 1952
Kuscheloniscus Strouhal, 1961
Madoniscus Paulian de Felice, 1950
Notoniscus Chilton, 1915
Paranotoniscus Barnard, 1932
Pectenoniscus Andersson, 1960
Sinoniscus Schultz, 1995
Styloniscus Dana, 1852
Thailandoniscus Dalens, 1989
Iuiuniscus Souza, Ferreira & Senna, 2015

References

Woodlice
Crustacean families